Folketing elections were held in Denmark on 23 March 1943 alongside Landsting elections, except in the Faroe Islands where they were held on 3 May. They were the first and only elections held during the German occupation, and although many people feared how the Germans might react to the election, the event took place peacefully. The voter turnout was at 89.5%, the highest of any Danish parliamentary election, and became a demonstration against the occupation. The Social Democratic Party remained the largest in the Folketing, with 66 of the 149 seats. After the elections, leading German newspapers expressed disappointment and indignation with the lack of political evolution among the Danish voters.

The Communist Party of Denmark had been banned since 1941 and could not participate in these elections.

95% of the vote went to the four biggest, traditional democratic parties. In the years since, there has been some debate about whether this can be seen as democratic support for the government's "cooperation" policy (samarbejdspolitikken) with the German occupation authorities. Some have argued that the result showed a broad unity of opinion in the population and among politicians in support of the relatively cooperative line taken by the government. Bertel Haarder, citing Knud Kristensen, has argued that the vote was sold as one of solidarity with the Danish constitution, democracy, and a rejection of totalitarian elements in society, and cannot therefore be seen as an explicit endorsement by the population of the government's line.

The Nazis permitted the election to proceed. The Nazis had consistently maintained that Denmark was still an independent country. The Nazis reportedly provided substantial financial support for the Danish Nazi Party. The five democratic parties (Social Democrats, Conservatives, Venstre, Social Liberal and the Justice Party) urged voters to support any of them. Political scientist Ben Arneson wrote of the election in 1943, "the result of the elections clearly indicates that democracy, parliamentarism, and strong anti-Nazi attitudes retain well-nigh universal support of the Danish electorate."

Results

Notes

References

Elections in Denmark
Denmark
1943 elections in Denmark
Denmark in World War II
March 1943 events